is a  video game developed by Millennium Kitchen and published by Sony Computer Entertainment for the PlayStation in Japan on June 22, 2000.

It is first game in the Boku no Natsuyasumi series, which also includes sequels released in 2002, 2007, and 2009.

A PlayStation Portable port of the original game was released on June 27, 2006, under the title . The port features updated graphics and several new characters.

Description 

The game revolves around "boku" (a Japanese first-person pronoun associated with young boys), a nine-year-old boy sent to his aunt and uncle in Japan's wooded countryside and the daily adventures he encounters there. Boku is there because his mother is in her final month of pregnancy. The player controls him for the 31 days of August 1975 as he enjoys his summer vacation. You explore the game's area and can catch bugs and pit them against each other, collect bottle caps, fly a kite, or just relax.

Development 

Game creator Kaz Ayabe said that he wanted to create a game that simulates the real world.
When development began, Millennium Kitchen handled everything about the game except for programming and sound design. According to Ayabe, Boku no Natsuyasumi'''s setting was inspired by the town of Tsukiyono, in the Yamanashi Prefecture of the Chūbu region. The team took many pictures of clouds during the staff's time collecting references for the game, some of which would go on to appear on the box art for the Japanese version of Everybody's Golf 3.

Ayabe stated that originally, the game was planned to be released in the summer of 1999, but Sony's producers asked the team to add in a fishing minigame, which delayed the game to 2000.

 Sequels Boku no Natsuyasumi spawned three sequels and two ports to portable consoles as of 2016. An iOS game was announced as part of a 2017 Sony foray into smartphone development.

Apart from the series proper, other games in the same style have been developed by Millennium Kitchen. These include Bokura no Kazoku ( "My Family"), a family simulation game, Attack of the Friday Monsters!: A Tokyo Tale, developed for Level-5's Guild series and the first Millennium Kitchen game with an official English-language release, and Shin-chan: Me and the Professor on Summer Vacation, a game where, instead of boku, the player takes on the role of the comic-strip and animation character Shin-chan as he spends his summer in Kyushu with his family. This game was released with Japanese voice-acting and text in English and other Western languages by Neos Corporation. On February 8, 2023, a new title in the series, Natsumon! 20-Seiki no Natsuyasumi'' was announced for Nintendo Switch.

References

External links 

 Official website (SCE) 
 Scroll Issue 10: Summer

Single-player video games
Adventure games
Japan-exclusive video games
Sony Interactive Entertainment games
Sony Interactive Entertainment franchises
2000 video games
PlayStation (console) games
PlayStation Portable games
Video game franchises introduced in 2000
Video games about children
Video games about insects
Video games developed in Japan
Video games set in 1975
Video games set in Japan
Works about vacationing
Millennium Kitchen games
Contrail (company) games